Qalat (also Romanized as Qalāt and Kalat) is a village in Qaqazan-e Gharbi Rural District, in the Central District of Takestan County, Qazvin Province, Iran. At the 2006 census, its population was 576, in 153 families.

References 

Populated places in Takestan County